Denmark participated in the Eurovision Song Contest 2002 with the song "Tell Me Who You Are" written by Michael Ronson. The song was performed by Malene Mortensen. The Danish broadcaster DR organised the national final Dansk Melodi Grand Prix 2002 in order to select the Danish entry for the 2002 contest in Tallinn, Estonia. Ten songs competed in a televised show where "Vis mig hvem du er" performed by Malene Mortensen was the winner as decided upon through two rounds of jury voting and public voting. The song was later translated from Danish to English for the Eurovision Song Contest and was titled "Tell Me Who You Are".

Denmark competed in the Eurovision Song Contest which took place on 25 May 2002. Performing during the show in position 14, Denmark placed twenty-fourth (last) out of the 24 participating countries, scoring 7 points.

Background 

Prior to the 2002 contest, Denmark had participated in the Eurovision Song Contest thirty-one times since its first entry in 1957. In the 2001 contest, "Never Ever Let You Go" performed by Rollo and King placed second. The Danish national broadcaster, DR, broadcasts the event within Denmark and organises the selection process for the nation's entry. The broadcaster organised the Dansk Melodi Grand Prix 2002 national final in order to select Denmark's entry for the 2002 contest; Denmark has selected all of their Eurovision entries through Dansk Melodi Grand Prix.

Before Eurovision

Dansk Melodi Grand Prix 2002 
Dansk Melodi Grand Prix 2002 was the 33rd edition of Dansk Melodi Grand Prix, the music competition that selects Denmark's entries for the Eurovision Song Contest. The event was held on 9 February 2002 at the Cirkusbygningen in Copenhagen, hosted by Michael Carøe and Signe Svendsen and televised on DR1. The national final was watched by 2.082 million viewers in Denmark, making it the most popular show of the week in the country and the most watched edition of Dansk Melodi Grand Prix.

Format 
Ten songs competed in one show where the winner was determined over two rounds of voting. In the first round, the top five songs based on the combination of votes from a public vote and a seven-member jury panel qualified to the superfinal. In the superfinal, the winner was determined again by the votes of the jury and public. Viewers were able to vote via telephone or SMS. The seven-member jury panel was composed of Keld Heick, Danish Eurovision 1983 entrant Gry Johansen, Kaare Norge, Sascha Dupont, Carsten Michael Laursen, Sanne Gottlieb and Jesper Degn.

Competing entries 
DR opened a submission period between 2 October 2001 and 5 November 2001 for composers to submit their entries. All composers and lyricists were required to be Danish citizens or have Danish residency, while all songs were required to be performed in Danish. The broadcaster received 662 entries during the submission period. A seven-member selection committee selected ten songs from the entries submitted to the broadcaster, while the artists of the selected entries were chosen by DR in consultation with their composers. The competing songs were announced on 13 December 2001 with their artists being announced on 9 January 2002. Among the artists was Helge Engelbrecht (member of Neighbours) who represented Denmark in the Eurovision Song Contest 1987 as part of Bandjo.

Final 
The final took place on 9 February 2002. In the first round of voting the top five advanced to the superfinal based on the votes of a seven-member jury and a public vote. In the superfinal, the winner, "Vis mig hvem du er" performed by Malene Mortensen, was selected by the public and jury vote. The telephone voting results of each of Denmark's four regions as well as the SMS and jury voting results in the superfinal were converted to points which were each distributed as follows: 4, 6, 8, 10 and 12 points. A total of 160,000 votes were received from the public during the show: 100,000 in the final and 60,000 in the superfinal.

In addition to the performances of the competing entries, British Eurovision 1968 and 1973 entrant Cliff Richard, Carmen Flamenco Dancers, Gabrielle and James Sampson performed as the interval acts.

Controversy 
The winning song of Dansk Melodi Grand Prix 2002, "Vis mig hvem du er", was ranked last by the jury in the second round despite receiving top points from all five public voting groups. Jurors Keld Heick, Sascha Dupont and Sanne Gottlieb publicly criticised the song for its poor lyrics and stated that "the Danes are too easy to fool" over "a great beat" and "a good chorus". Gottlieb also accused the media of favouring Malene Mortensen before the competition due to her being well-known. Subsequently, Mortensen cancelled her scheduled appearance in the programme Hit med sangen which Dupont also participated in.

Promotion 
Malene Mortensen specifically promoted "Vis mig hvem du er" as the Danish Eurovision entry between 15 and 16 February 2002 by performing the song during the Maltese Eurovision national final.

At Eurovision
According to Eurovision rules, all nations with the exceptions of the bottom six countries in the 2001 contest competed in the final. On 9 November 2001, a special allocation draw was held which determined the running order and Denmark was set to perform in position 14, following the entry from the Finland and before the entry from Bosnia and Herzegovina. At the contest, Malene Mortensen performed the English version of "Vis mig hvem du er", titled "Tell Me Who You Are". Denmark finished in twenty-fourth (last) place with 7 points. This was the first time Denmark finished in last place at the Eurovision Song Contest.

The show was broadcast on DR1 with commentary by Keld Heick. The Danish spokesperson, who announced the Danish votes during the final, was Signe Svendsen. The contest was watched by a total of 2 million viewers in Denmark.

Voting 
Below is a breakdown of points awarded to Denmark and awarded by Denmark in the contest. The nation awarded its 12 points to Malta in the contest.

References

2002
Countries in the Eurovision Song Contest 2002
Eurovision
Eurovision